Octavius is an early writing in defense of Christianity by Marcus Minucius Felix. It is written in the form of a dialogue between the pagan Caecilius Natalis and the Christian Octavius Januarius, a provincial lawyer, the friend and fellow-student of the author.

Summary
The scene is pleasantly and graphically laid on the beach at Ostia on a holiday afternoon, and the discussion is represented as arising out of the homage paid by Caecilius, in passing, to the Cult image of Serapis. His arguments for paganism (possibly modelled on those of Celsus) are taken up one at a time by Octavius, with the result that the assailant is convinced. Minucius himself plays the part of umpire. The form of the dialogue is modelled on the De natura deorum and De divinatione of Cicero and its style is both vigorous and elegant if at times not exempt from something of the affectation of the age.

Analysis
Its Latinity is not of the specifically Christian type. If the doctrines of the Divine unity, the resurrection, and future rewards and punishments are left out of the account, the work has less the character of an exposition of Christianity than of a philosophical and ethical polemic against the absurdities of polytheism.  While it thus has much in common with the Greek Apologies it is full of the strong common sense that marks the Latin mind. Its ultimate appeal is to the fruits of faith.

Manuscript
Arnobius of Sicca's Adversus nationes survived in a single ninth-century manuscript in Paris (and a bad copy of it in Brussels). The French manuscript also contains the Octavius of Marcus Minucius Felix.

Legacy
This work was referenced in 1751 by Pope Benedict XIV in his apostolic constitution 'Providas' against freemasonry by quoting Caecilius Natalis: 'Honest things always rejoice in the public, crimes are secret'.

Editions and Translations

Editions
Minucius Felix. Octavius. Texte établi et traduit par . Paris: Société d'Édition «Les belles lettres», 1964.
M. Minucii Felicis Octavius. Edidit . Leipzig: Teubner, 1982. 2. Auflage: Stuttgart, Teubner, 1992, ISBN 3-8154-1539-X.

English Translations
The Octavius of Marcus Minucius Felix, translated and annotated by ), 1974 (Ancient Christian Writers, 39).

References

External links
Octavius in English translation
Octavius, original Latin
Links for both Latin and English PDFs of Octavius
Octavius with Latin, English, and analysis at Open Library, various formats
 
Editio princeps of the Octavius as liber octavus of Arnobius' Disputationes adversus gentes, Rome 1542. (Online at the Bavarian State Library)

2nd-century Christian texts

2nd-century Latin books
Dialogues